

A brougham was a light, four-wheeled horse-drawn carriage built in the 19th century. It was named after the politician and jurist Lord Brougham, who had this type of carriage built to his specification by London coachbuilder Robinson & Cook in 1838 or 1839.  It had an enclosed body with two doors, like the rear section of a coach; it sat two, sometimes with an extra pair of fold-away seats in the front corners, and with a box seat in front for the driver and a footman or passenger. Unlike a coach, the carriage had a glazed front window, so that the occupants could see forward. The forewheels were capable of turning sharply. A variant, called a brougham-landaulet, had a top collapsible from the rear doors backward.

Four features specific to the Brougham were:
 the absence of a perch - the spring hangers were mounted directly to the body structure, saving weight and lowering the floor, to ease entry
 the sharply squared end of the roof at the back,
 the body line curving forward at the base of the enclosure, and
 low entry to the enclosure, using only one outside step below the door.

In popular culture

Broughams are a common means of transport in the Sherlock Holmes stories.

The Picture of Dorian Gray by Oscar Wilde mentions the brougham alongside a number of other carriage vehicles of the era, such as the omnibus, the hansom cab, the four-in-hand, and the victoria.

In L. P. Hartley's novel The Go Between a brougham is sent to fetch the character Marian (chapter 23, p.274 [1st ed.]).

In the book The Alienist by Caleb Carr, a frequently used mode of transportation for the characters is a brougham.

In Rudyard Kipling's poem "The Mary Gloster", the dying Sir Anthony complains bitterly to his son about never seeing "the doctor's trusty brougham to help the missus unload" – a reference to the effete Dickie's childless marriage and hence the extinction of his family.

In the novel The Crimson Petal and the White, by Michel Faber, William Rackham purchases a brougham as a surprise gift for his wife, Agnes Rackham, with the help of his beautiful mistress, a former prostitute known as Sugar.

See also
 Brougham (car body), inspired by the brougham carriage
 Clarence (carriage), larger version of the Brougham
 Landaulet, (landaulette in British English) car body style inspired by the landaulet carriage
 Types of carriage

Footnotes

Notes

References

External links

1871 Advertisement for William Kilross & Sons and Kinross Brougham Illustrations and text
CAAOnline: Carriage Tour Carriage Association of America. Illustration and text
Horse Drawn Brougham, The Henry Ford. Henry Ford Museum, Dearborn, Michigan. Photo and text.
The Long Island Museum of American Art, History & Carriages, Stony Brook, New York: Collection Database. Search brougham; illustrations and text.
Victorian Brougham carriage and The Victorian Brougham at the Institute of Texan Cultures TTM web. Texas Transportation Museum, San Antonio. Photos
Articles about Horse-drawn Carriages

Carriages